Dictionarium quatuor linguarum (The Dictionary of Four Languages) is a 16th-century book by the German polymath Hieronymus Megiser that includes a multilingual dictionary and a multilingual grammar of Italian, Slovene, German, and Latin. It also includes some Croatian words. It was compiled and published in 1592 in Graz (Austria), then part of the Habsburg monarchy. The dictionary is the first multilingual dictionary of Slovene. The appendix, named Exempla aliquot declinationum et coniugationium (Some examples of declensions and conjugations) contains some grammar of the included languages and has been recognised as the second grammar of Slovene and the first multilingual grammar that includes Slovene. The book marks the beginning of Slovene lexicography. An extended edition was published under the same title in 1744 at Klagenfurt (Austria) by the Jesuits. This second edition also contains example phrases in German and Slovene, illustrating the use of the entries given. The number of Slovene equivalents in this edition is notably higher; they often reflect Carinthian Slovene.

Notes

References

External links
 Dictionarum quatuor linguarum. Full digitised version. Det Kongelige Bibliotek [Royal Danish Library], Copenhagen. Retrieved 20 March 2012.

Slovene dictionaries
German dictionaries
Italian dictionaries
Latin dictionaries
1592 books
History of linguistics
Cultural history of Slovenia
Cultural history of Croatia